John Connock was an English politician who sat in the House of Commons at various times between 1554 and 1571.

Connock was a tanner from Wiltshire. He was appointed receiver of the Duchy of Cornwall and acquired extensive properties at Liskeard at the time of the dissolution of the monasteries.

In 1554, Connock was elected Member of Parliament for Liskeard. He was re-elected MP for Liskeard in 1571.

References

Year of birth missing
Year of death missing
Members of the pre-1707 English Parliament for constituencies in Cornwall
People from Wiltshire
English MPs 1554–1555
English MPs 1571